The Islamic Azad University, Tafresh Branch is a branch of Iran's Islamic Azad Universities. It is situated in the city of Tafresh 222 kilometers southwest of Tehran. This university with more than 3000 students and more than 100 professors provides 20 different majors.

See also
Tafresh University
Higher education in Iran
List of Iranian Universities

External links
Islamic Azad University - Tafresh Branch Official Web Site 
About the Tafresh Azad University, in Persian

Educational institutions established in 1982
tafresh|Tafresh
Education in Markazi Province
Tafresh
Buildings and structures in Markazi Province
1982 establishments in Iran